James B. Clark Jr. (February 8, 1957 – April 19, 1996) was an inmate executed in the State of Delaware for the murder of his adoptive parents. Clark confessed to the crime. He was motivated by a desire for the couple's life insurance. The murders took place on May 22, 1994, one month after he had been released on parole for an earlier conviction. Clark had served 21 years of a 30-year sentence for his attempted slaying of a 3-year-old girl in 1973, but in spite of his failure to participate in rehabilitation and repeated discipline by prison authorities for fighting, he was released for good behavior. His case inspired public outrage and proposed legislation to curtail unwarranted early release.

Early life
Clark was born on February 8, 1957, and was a resident of the State of Delaware. He was adopted by Elizabeth and James B. Clark Sr.. The identity of his birth parents is unknown.

When Clark was two years old, he developed a pattern of frequently attacking other children. He was expelled from two pre-kindergarten programs due to his behavior and began receiving psychotherapy and medication when he was 5.

In 1965, Clark attacked a child, cutting their face badly enough that they needed hospitalization. After this incident, he was sent to a psychiatric treatment program in Maryland for three years. In December 1969, after being expelled from school once more, Clark was sent to the Governor Bacon Health Center, where he received residential treatment for 1.5 years.

The center said Clark had "moderately improved" following his diagnosis for passive-aggressive personality disorder and schizoid personality. He returned to school in September 1971 and managed to finish 8th grade despite poor grades and behavior problems.

On March 5, 1973, Clark, then 16, abducted a three-year-old girl from her backyard. He took her into the woods, where he beat and choked her. Clark was convicted of kidnapping and assault with intent to commit murder, but that conviction was reversed. He then pleaded no contest to abducting a child under the age of 12 and assault with intent to commit murder, and was sentenced to 30 years in prison. In 1977, Clark pleaded guilty to third degree assault for attacking a prison officer.

Execution
On September 9, 1994, Clark pleaded guilty to two counts of first degree murder. He was sentenced to death. After waiving his appeals, Clark was executed by lethal injection on April 19, 1996.

See also
 Capital punishment in Delaware
 Capital punishment in the United States
 List of people executed in Delaware

References

1957 births
1996 deaths
1994 murders in the United States
20th-century executions by Delaware
American people executed for murder
Executed people from Delaware
People convicted of murder by Delaware
People executed by Delaware by lethal injection
20th-century executions of American people
People with passive-aggressive personality disorder
People with schizoid personality disorder